Leopold Bloom is the fictional protagonist and hero of James Joyce's 1922 novel Ulysses. His peregrinations and encounters in Dublin on 16 June 1904 mirror, on a more mundane and intimate scale, those of Ulysses/Odysseus in Homer's epic poem: The Odyssey.

Factual antecedents 
When Joyce first started planning a story in 1906 called "Ulysses" to be included in Dubliners, the central character was based on a Dublin acquaintance named Alfred Hunter whom Joyce had met traveling to a funeral in July 1904.

Another model was probably Italo Svevo.

The character's name (and maybe some of his personality) may have been inspired by Joyce's Trieste acquaintance Leopoldo Popper.  Popper was a Jew of Bohemian descent who had hired Joyce as an English tutor for his daughter Amalia. Popper managed the company of Popper and Blum and it is possible that the name Leopold Bloom was invented by taking Popper's first name and anglicizing the name Blum.

Fictional biography
Bloom is introduced to the reader as a man of appetites:

Mr. Leopold Bloom ate with relish the inner organs of beasts and fowls. He liked thick giblet soup, nutty gizzards, a stuffed roast heart, liverslices fried with crustcrumbs, fried hencods' roes. But most of all, he liked grilled mutton kidneys which gave to his palate a fine tang of faintly scented urine.

The Bloom character, born in 1866, is the only son of Rudolf Virág (a Hungarian Jew from Szombathely who emigrated to Ireland, converted from Judaism to Protestantism, changed his name to Rudolph Bloom and later died by suicide), and of Ellen Higgins, an Irish Protestant. He is uncircumcised. They lived in Clanbrassil Street, Portobello. Bloom converted to Catholicism to marry Marion (Molly) Tweedy on 8 October 1888. The couple has one daughter, Millicent (Milly), born in 1889; their son Rudolph (Rudy), born in December 1893, died after 11 days. The family lives at 7 Eccles Street in Dublin.

Episodes (chapters) in Ulysses relate a series of encounters and incidents in Bloom's contemporary odyssey through Dublin in the course of the single day of 16 June 1904 (although episodes 1 to 3, 9 and to a lesser extent 7, are primarily concerned with Stephen Dedalus, who in the plan of the story is the counterpart of Telemachus). Joyce aficionados celebrate 16 June as 'Bloomsday'.

As the day unfolds, Bloom's thoughts turn to the affair between Molly and her manager, Hugh 'Blazes' Boylan (obliquely, through, for instance, telltale ear worms), and, prompted by the funeral of his friend Paddy Dignam, the death of his child, Rudy. The absence of a son may be what leads him to take a shine to Stephen, for whom he goes out of his way in the book's latter episodes, rescuing him from a brothel, walking him back to his own house, and even offering him a place there to study and work. The reader becomes familiar with Bloom's tolerant, humanistic outlook, his penchant for voyeurism and his (purely epistolary) infidelity. Bloom detests violence, and his relative indifference to Irish nationalism leads to disputes with some of his peers (most notably 'the Citizen' in the Cyclops chapter). Although Bloom has never been a practicing Jew, converted to Roman Catholicism to marry Molly, and has in fact received Christian baptism on three occasions, he is of partial Jewish descent and is sometimes ridiculed and threatened because of his being perceived as a Jew.

Richard Ellmann, Joyce's biographer, described Bloom as "a nobody", who "has virtually no effect upon the life around him".  In this Ellmann found nobility: "The divine part of Bloom is simply his humanity - his assumption of a bond between himself and other created beings."  Others such as Joseph Campbell see him more as an Everyman figure, a world (cosmopolis) traveler who, like Homer's Odysseus "visited the dwellings of many people and considered their ways of thinking" (Odyssey 1.3).

Popular culture

Joyce told Sylvia Beach that Holbrook Jackson resembled Bloom.

Writer-director Mel Brooks used the name "Leo Bloom" for the mousy accountant in his film/musical The Producers. Leo is a nervous accountant, prone to panic attacks, who keeps a security blanket to calm himself. Nevertheless, it is Leo who has the idea of how to make money from a failed play. In the 2001 stage musical and its 2005 film adaptation, after realizing his inner potential, Leo loudly asks "When's it gonna be Bloom's Day?" Hidden in the background of the office of Max Bialystock is a calendar marked for June 16, which is Bloomsday.

Former Pink Floyd bandmate Roger Waters references Leopold Bloom in his song "Flickering Flame" as sitting with Molly Malone.

Jeffrey Meyer suggested in "Orwell's Apocalypse: Coming Up for Air, Modern Fiction Studies" that George Orwell's character George Bowling was modelled on Leopold Bloom.
 
Grace Slick's song "Rejoyce", from the album After Bathing at Baxter's, concerns the novel Ulysses; Bloom is mentioned in the song.

References

External links
 "The Greatest Jew of all" : James Joyce, Leopold Bloom, and the Modernist Archetype, Morton P. Levitt, Papers on Joyce, 10/11 (2004–2005), pp. 143–162
 Ulysses Seen – ch. IV Calypso visualisation of Bloom in his first appearance in Ulysses
 

Ulysses (novel) characters
Fictional Irish people
Fictional Jews
Literary characters introduced in 1918
Characters in novels of the 20th century
People educated at The High School, Dublin
Male characters in literature
Everyman